Charles Robert Gatewood (November 8, 1942 – April 28, 2016) was an American photographer, writer, videographer, artist and educator, who lived and worked in San Francisco, California.

Biography

Early years 

Gatewood was born November 8, 1942, in Elgin, Illinois. From ages one to three Gatewood lived with his father, John Jay Gatewood (a traveling salesman) and his mother, Clarene Hall Gatewood (a housewife) near Dallas, Texas. In 1945 the family moved to Rolla, Missouri, where Gatewood's father found work as a traveling salesman. In 1951, the Gatewood family moved to Springfield, Missouri, where Charles attended J.P Study Jr. High and Parkview High School.

Education 
From 1960 to 1964, Gatewood attended the University of Missouri, majoring in Anthropology and taking a minor in art history. In 1964, as he was finishing his first year of graduate work, Gatewood met George W. Gardner, a gifted student photographer. Gatewood credited Gardner's work and a Museum of Modern Art photography book, "The Family of Man" as influences that helped him choose a career in photography.

European studies 
From 1964 to 1966, Gatewood lived and worked in Stockholm, Sweden. He enrolled at the University of Stockholm to study sociology and apprenticed with a group of documentary photographers.  In 1965, after exploring Europe, Gatewood returned to Sweden and found work as a darkroom technician for AB Text & Bilder, a Stockholm news agency. At night, Gatewood took advantage of his press pass and the agency's sophisticated equipment to photograph jazz concerts and happenings.

On April 29, 1966, Gatewood photographed the press conference and concert of musician Bob Dylan. One photograph, "Dylan With Sunglasses and Cigarette," was syndicated and received worldwide publication. It was Gatewood's first sale, his first published picture. "Taking the Bob Dylan photo gave me faith I could actually be a professional photographer," said Gatewood.

Other celebrity photos taken by Gatewood during this time include pictures of Martin Luther King Jr., Ornette Coleman, Sonny Rollins, Joan Baez, Duke Ellington and Ella Fitzgerald.

The Manhattan years 
In June, 1966, Gatewood returned to the United States, rented an apartment on Manhattan's Lower East Side, and found work as second assistant at Jaffe-Smith photography studio in Greenwich Village. Ten months later, after learning studio photography techniques and advanced darkroom skills, Gatewood quit Jaffee-Smith and began his career as a freelance photographer.

Rents were cheap, and the photography market was booming. Gatewood rented part of a photography studio at 8 East 12th Street, and sold photos to textbooks, magazines, poster companies, and other editorial markets. From 1970 to 1974 Gatewood worked as staff photographer for the Manhattan Tribune. He also photographed on assignment for The New York Times, Rolling Stone, Harper's, Business Week, Time and other magazines.

In 1972 and 1976, Gatewood was awarded CAPS fellowships by the New York State Arts Council. In 1975, Sidetripping, Gatewood's first photography book, was published, with text by William S. Burroughs. The book was widely praised. A.D. Coleman, writing in The New York Times, said, "Gatewood's work is freakish, earthy, blunt, erotic--most of all, terribly and beautifully alive."

Gatewood's work during this period included shots of Mardi Gras in New Orleans (12 times), Gay Pride celebrations and Manhattan's downtown music and art scene. The notables he photographed in this time span include Andy Warhol, Allen Ginsberg, Sly Stone, Luis Buñuel, Bernardo Bertolucci, Ron Wood, Carlos Santana, Abbie Hoffman, Etta James, Gil Evans and Nelson Rockefeller.

The Woodstock years 
From 1978 to 1987, Gatewood lived near Woodstock, New York, and worked in Manhattan and elsewhere. His photos from this period include one of social protests, rock festivals, Mardi Gras in New Orleans, body modification, outlaw bikers, and nature. The celebrities he captured images of include Larry Clark, Annie Sprinkle, Michael O'Donoghue, Ira Cohen and Quentin Crisp.

In 1984 the New York State Arts Council awarded Gatewood a grant to publish Wall Street photographs, and in 1985 the book Wall Street was awarded the Leica Medal of Excellence for Outstanding Humanistic Photojournalism. In 1985, a feature film about Gatewood, titled "Dances Sacred and Profane", premiered at the Antwerp Film Festival and was screened in U.S. theaters to critical acclaim.

San Francisco 

From 1987, Gatewood lived and worked in San Francisco, California. From 1998 to 2010, he was a photographer for Skin and Ink magazine. During this period, Gatewood produced over thirty documentary videos about body modification, fetish fashion and other alternative interests. His San Francisco period subjects include the Folsom Street Fair (15 times), Dadafest (4 times) and Burning Man (4 times). Gatewood also photographed a number of nude studies during this period.

Gatewood's documentation of alternative culture in San Francisco is unmatched. People he photographed include Lawrence Ferlinghetti, Herb Gold, Charles Henri Ford, Carol Queen, Ron Turner and Ruth Bernard.

In 1994 Barbara Nitke attended her first meeting of The Eulenspiegel Society, the oldest SM support and educational group in the country, to see a presentation by Gatewood. The couples she met in the SM scene fascinated her, and she began photographing them in 1994. They became the focus of her book, Kiss of Fire: A Romantic View of Sadomasochism (2003). It was among the first mainstream publications to examine the subject of BDSM.

Gatewood's photo books from this period include A Complete Unknown, Burroughs 23, Badlands, True Blood, The Body and Beyond and Primitives.  In 1986 Pocket Books published his novel Hellfire.

Death 
Gatewood died in San Francisco on April 28, 2016, after sustaining serious injuries in a fall from his balcony three weeks earlier, in an apparent suicide attempt.  He left several notes behind.  He was 73.

Books published 
Discovery in Song, New York, Paulist Press, 1969
Sidetripping with William S. Burroughs, New York, Strawberry Hill Books, 1975, Last Gasp, 2002
People in Focus, Garden City, New York, Amphoto, 1977
X-1000 with Spider Webb and Marco Vassi, Woodstock, N.Y., R.Mutt Press, 1977
Publishing Ink: The Fine Art of Tattooing with Spider Webb and Marco Vassi, New York, Simon and Schuster, 1979
How to Take Great Pictures with Your Simple Camera, New York, Doubleday, 1982
Wall Street, Woodstock, New York, R. Mutt Press, 1984
Hellfire, New York, Pocket Books, 1987
Primitives, Woodstock, New York, R. Mutt Press, 1992, Last Gasp, 2002
Charles Gatewood Photographs, San Francisco, Flash Publications, 1993
Badlands, Frankfurt, Goliath Books, 1999
A Complete Unknown, San Francisco, DanaDanaDana Editions, 2009
Burroughs 23, San Francisco, DanaDanaDana Editions, 2011

Solo exhibitions 

1968 Lewison Gallery, City College, New York
1972 Light Gallery, New York
1975 Neikrug Gallery, New York
1975 Brummels Gallery, Melbourne, Australia
1976 Australian Center for Photography, Sydney
1977 University of West Virginia, Morgantown
1977 Levitan Gallery, New York City, "X-1000"
1978 Steiglitz Gallery, New  York City, "Wall Street"
1978 Light Works, Syracuse University, "Forbidden
1994 Rita Dean Gallery, San Diego, CA
1978 Project Arts Center, Cambridge, MA "Forbidden Photographs"
1978 Contrejour Gallery, Paris
1978 Catskill Center for Photography, Woodstock, NY
1978 Metropolitan State College, Denver, CO
1978 Colorado Center for Photographic Studies, University of Colorado at Boulder
1979 Gallery Vior, Toulouse, France
1981 Robert Samuel Gallery, New York City
1984 Rhode Island School of Design, Providence, RI
1986 Drew University, Madison, NJ
1988 Level Three Gallery, Philadelphia, PA
1988 Bobo Gallery, San Francisco, CA
1989 Neikrug Gallery, New York
1992 Morphos Gallery, San Francisco
1993 Photographic Image Gallery Portland, OR
1994 Clayton Gallery, New York, "Charles Gatewood Photographs”
1994 Magic Theater, San Francisco, CA
1994,96 Morphos Gallery, San Francisco
1995 Dark's Art Parlour, Santa Ana, CA
1995 Clayton Gallery, New York
1995 Anon Salon, San Francisco, CA
1995 Komm Ausstellungswerkstatt, Nuremberg, Germany
1995 University of Tübingen, Tugingen, Germany
1996 Clayton Gallery, NYC
1997 Williamsburg Art and Historical Center, Brooklyn, NY "The Body and Beyond"
1998 Merry Karnowsky Gallery, LA, CA
1999 Sacred Body Art Gallery, NYC
2001 Ehrngren Gallery, Stockholm
2002 Art@Large, NYC
2003 Sacred Tattoo Gallery, NYC
2003 Das Gelbe Haus, Zurich
2003 Clayton Gallery, NYC
2003 Good Vibrations Gallery, San Francisco
2003 Stormy Leather Gallery, San Francisco
2005 Art @ Large, NYC
2006 Rags to Riches, The Lola Gallery (now McGovern Design House), San Francisco
2006 Center for Sex and Culture, San Francisco
2007, 2009, 2011  Robert Tat gallery, San Francisco
2008 Gallery 32, London England
2016 Ladybug House, San Francisco

The Charles Gatewood Archive 

The Charles Gatewood photograph archive and related material at The Bancroft Library, University of California, Berkeley contains "...250,000 images, including all his contact sheets and their corresponding negatives; hundreds of stock images..." The collection also includes manuscript notes, personal diaries and a significant portion of Gatewood's personal library.

References

1942 births
2016 deaths
American photographers
Artists from San Francisco
People from Elgin, Illinois
University of Missouri alumni
Writers from San Francisco